Toormakeady or Tourmakeady (the official name) is a Gaeltacht in south County Mayo in the west of Ireland. As at the time of the 2011 census, Toormakeady had a total population of 1,007, having dropped from 1,150 in 1991. Toormakeady is also the name of the principal village in the area.

Those parts of Ballinchalla Electoral District in Toormakeady and the whole of the Owenbrin Electoral District in Toormakeady together comprise nearly half of the land area of Toormakeady and were previously parts of County Galway. In 1898 they were transferred to County Mayo.

From the time of the Great Famine of the mid-1840s onwards, the Toormakeady area has experienced a high level of emigration.  Many descendants of emigrants return every year to find their roots. The genealogical records for this area have been computerised at the South Mayo Family Research Centre in nearby Ballinrobe to make the task of tracing roots easier.

On 3 May 1921, during the Irish War of Independence the Irish Republican Army south Mayo flying column of around 30 men together with a small number of men from east Mayo mounted an ambush at Toormakeady. The events of this day have been written about in Donal Buckley's book The Battle of Tourmakeady.

The English actor Robert Shaw, best known for his work in From Russia with Love, Jaws and The Sting, lived in Drimbawn House, Toormakeady until his death in 1978. Television producer Máire Ní Thuathail was born in Toormakeady in 1959.

See also
 Connacht Irish
 List of towns and villages in the Republic of Ireland
 Thomas Plunket, 2nd Baron Plunket

References

External links

 Toormakeady website
 Toormakeady Community website
Audio podcast excerpt from Michael John Casey's Heritage Tour of Toormakeady.

Gaeltacht places in County Mayo
Towns and villages in County Mayo
Gaeltacht towns and villages
Waterfalls of the Republic of Ireland